Philip  Holditch (died c. 1608), of Totnes and Blackawton, Devon, was an English merchant and politician.

He was elected Mayor of Totnes for 1598–99 and a Member (MP) of the Parliament of England for Totnes in 1601.

He married Susanna Crossing and had at least 4 sons and 4 daughters. His eldest son Philip, was also Mayor and MP for Totnes.

References

 

16th-century births
1608 deaths
16th-century English politicians
English MPs 1601
Members of the Parliament of England (pre-1707) for Totnes
Mayors of Totnes